Robert Lee Thompson (born September 9, 1962) is a former American football wide receiver in the National Football League (NFL) who played for the Denver Broncos. He played college football at Youngstown State University.

References 

Living people
Youngstown State Penguins football players
1962 births
American football wide receivers
Denver Broncos players